Vanna Kanavugal is a 1987 Indian Tamil-language film directed by Ameerjan and produced by Kavithalayaa Productions. The film stars Karthik, Murali and Jayashree. It is a remake of the 1984 Malayalam film Adiyozhukkukal. The film, which notably features no songs, was released on 9 July 1987 and emerged a success.

Plot

Cast 
Karthik
Murali
Jayashree
Anand
Charle
Nassar
Typist Gopu
Harathi Ganesh

Production 
Vanna Kanavugal is the feature film debut of Anand. The dialogues were written by Vairamuthu.

Release and reception 
Vanna Kanavugal was released on 9 July 1987. The Indian Express wrote, "Karthik has shown that he can play the tough guy too". Jayamanmadhan of Kalki appreciated the lack of songs, the dialogues and outdoor photography, but felt many unnecessary characters were abundant. Though Ameerjan was sceptical about the film's commercial viability, given its lack of songs, the film was a success and ran for over 100 days in theatres.

See also 
 List of Indian films without songs

References

External links 
 

1980s Tamil-language films
1987 films
Films directed by Ameerjan
Tamil remakes of Malayalam films
Films scored by V. S. Narasimhan